Cranley Gardens railway station was a station in the Muswell Hill area of north London. It was located between Highgate and Muswell Hill stations, at the junction of Muswell Hill Road and Cranley Gardens. Nothing remains of the station today and its site is now occupied by housing and a school. In the 1930s, plans were made to electrify the line and transfer the mainline service to London Underground's Northern line, but these were abandoned after the Second World War. The station closed for passengers in 1954 and for goods in 1957.

History

The branch line from the Great Northern Railway's (GNR's) station at Highgate to Alexandra Palace was built by the Muswell Hill Railway (MHR) and opened on 24 May 1873. Cranley Gardens station opened on 2 August 1902. In 1911, the line was taken over by the GNR. After the 1921 Railways Act created the Big Four railway companies, the line became part of the London & North Eastern Railway (LNER) from 1923. The LNER closed the station on 1 December 1930 and reopened it in July 1932.

In 1935, the London Passenger Transport Board (LPTB) planned, as part of its "Northern Heights plan" to take over the line from LNER together with the LNER's routes from Finsbury Park to Edgware and High Barnet. The line was to be modernised to use electric trains and amalgamated with the Northern line. At Finsbury Park, the line was to be connected to the Northern line's Northern City branch so that services from Cranley Gardens would have continued to Moorgate.

Works to modernise the track began in the late 1930s and were well advanced when they were halted by the Second World War. Works were completed from Highgate to High Barnet and Mill Hill East and that section was incorporated into the Northern line. Works on the tracks between Finsbury Park and Alexandra Palace were halted and the LNER continued to be operate the line. In 1942, LNER services through Cranley Gardens were reduced to rush hour only operations.

After the war, no work was carried out as maintenance works and reconstruction of war damage on the existing network had the greatest call on LPTB funds. Funds for new works were severely limited and priority was given to the completion of the western and eastern extensions of the Central line to West Ruislip, Epping and Hainault. Despite being shown as under construction on underground maps as late as 1950, work never restarted on the unimplemented parts of the Northern Heights plan. British Railways (the successor to the LNER) closed the line temporarily from 29 October 1951 until 7 January 1952, before the last passenger services ran between Finsbury Park and Alexandra Palace on 3 July 1954.

The line continued to be used for goods services until 18 May 1957, when it was closed completely. The track was subsequently removed and the buildings were demolished. The station buildings and platforms remained until demolished in the late 1960s and a school now occupies the site. Sections of the trackbed between Muswell Hill and Finsbury Park is now the Parkland Walk.

See also
 Edgware, Highgate and London Railway

Notes and references

Notes

References

Bibliography

External links
  Cranley Gardens station in 1935
 Disused stations - Cranley Gardens

Disused railway stations in the London Borough of Haringey
Former Great Northern Railway stations
Railway stations in Great Britain opened in 1902
Railway stations in Great Britain closed in 1930
Railway stations in Great Britain opened in 1932
Railway stations in Great Britain closed in 1951
Railway stations in Great Britain opened in 1952
Railway stations in Great Britain closed in 1954
Proposed London Underground stations
Unopened Northern Heights extension stations